The Palmiet Pumped Storage Scheme consists of two  turbine units located  upstream of the Kogelberg Dam on the Palmiet River near Cape Town, South Africa. The pumped-storage hydroelectricity plant is capable of responding to a surge in peak power demand in minutes.  At night, excess power on the grid generated by conventional coal and nuclear plants is used to pump water to the upper Rockview Dam overlooking Gordon's Bay.

It is regarded as a forerunner in environmental engineering.  The whole Palmiet site is a conservation area and in December 1998 the area was declared a Biosphere Reserve by UNESCO - the first in South Africa.

See also 

 Eskom
 List of hydropower stations in Africa

References

External links 
 Palmiet Pumped Storage Scheme  on the Eskom-Website

Pumped-storage hydroelectric power stations in South Africa
Elgin, Western Cape
Buildings and structures in the Western Cape
Economy of the Western Cape